The Rosmalen Grass Court Championships, branded by its sponsored name as the Libéma Open since 2018, (formerly known as the Continental Grass Court Championships, Heineken Trophy, Ordina Open, UNICEF Open, Topshelf Open and RICOH Open), is a professional tennis tournament held in the town of Rosmalen, on the outskirts of the city of 's-Hertogenbosch (Den Bosch), the Netherlands. The men's and women's tennis matches are played on outdoors grass courts at the Autotron convention center, and constitute a stage on the ATP Tour and the WTA Tour.

In 1989 a two-group round robin invitational tournament with eight players was organized in Rosmalen which was won by Miloslav Mečíř. The next year, 1990, the tournament became part of the newly founded ATP Tour and was officially called the Continental Grass Court Championships. At the time of its founding it was the only grass court event held in continental Europe. The tournament is used by tennis pros as a preparation for the Wimbledon Championships and was held the week prior to Wimbledon until 2014. From 2015 onwards it is held the week following the French Open. In 1996 a women's singles and doubles event dubbed Wilkinson Championships was added to the tournament.

It is classified as an ATP 250 event on the men's ATP Tour and a WTA 250 event on the women's WTA Tour.

Past finals

Men's singles

Women's singles

Men's doubles

Women's doubles

Notes

References

External links
 

 
Tennis tournaments in the Netherlands
Grass court tennis tournaments
WTA Tour
ATP Tour 250
Recurring sporting events established in 1990
1990 establishments in the Netherlands
International sports competitions hosted by the Netherlands
Sports competitions in 's-Hertogenbosch